Simplenote is a note-taking application with Markdown support. In addition to being accessible via most web browsers, cross-platform apps are available on Android, Linux, Windows, iOS, and macOS.

Simplenote has an externally accessible API, allowing other clients to be written: macOS Dashboard widget DashNote; nvPY, a cross-platform Simplenote client; amongst others. In addition, the macOS program Notational Velocity and the Windows utility ResophNotes can also sync with Simplenote.

History

Simplenote was originally developed by Simperium in 2008.

Simplenote Premium was introduced on November 23, 2009. It removed ads and added extra features such as syncing Simplenote with Dropbox.

Automattic acquired Simperium and Simplenote on January 24, 2013. In September, Automattic released an Android version and later relaunched Simplenote, which suspended the premium service and removed ads for all users.

In May 2016, an official client for Linux for Simplenote was released.

Automattic open sourced code for its Android, Electron, iOS, and macOS Simplenote apps in August 2016, making all its client apps open source.

Reception

The application was reviewed by Mac Life, reviewed in the book Lifehacker: The Guide to Working Smarter, Faster, and Better, and covered in the book The Business of iPhone and iPad App Development.

References

External links 

 
 

Android (operating system) software
Automattic
Free note-taking software
Freeware
IOS software
Linux
MacOS text-related software
Note-taking software
Windows text-related software